Cepola is a genus of marine ray-finned fishes belonging to the bandfish family, Cepolidae. The name red bandfish is applied to all members of this genus, but particularly C. macrophthalma, and generally not C. australis, which is also known as the Australian bandfish.

Taxonomy
Cepola was first formally described as a genus in 1764 by Carolus Linnaeus with Ophidion macrophthalmum as the type species by monotypy.  The generic name Cepola means "little onion", Linnaeus did not explain why he chose this name. It is likely derived from cepollam or cepulam, which in 1686 was said by Francis Willughby to be local names among Roman fishermen for the similar "Fierasfer", a pearlfish, to which Linnaeus believed Cepola macrophthalma was related. As well as this, in 1872 Giovanni Canestrini reported that in Naples the common name for C. macropthalma is Pesce cipolia meaning “onion fish”.

Species
There are currently five recognized species in this genus:
 Cepola australis J. D. Ogilby, 1899 (Australian bandfish)
 Cepola haastii (Hector, 1881)
 Cepola macrophthalma (Linnaeus, 1758) (Red bandfish)
 Cepola pauciradiata Cadenat, 1950
 Cepola schlegelii Bleeker, 1854

There may be a sixth species, as yet undescribed, from the waters near Bermuda.

Characteristics
Cepola bandfishes are similar to Acanthocepola bandfishes, in that they have the last ray of the dorsal and anal fins connected to the caudal fin by a membrane. The differences are that they do not have spines on the margin of the preoperculum and they have naked, unscaled cheeks. They are normally pinkish or reddish in colour.

Distribution, habitat and biology 
Cepola bandfishes are found in the eastern Atlantic, Indian and Western Pacific Oceans, including the Mediterranean Sea. They create burrows in flat areas of sand and mud substrates, feeding on zooplankton.

Cultural significance
The oldest recorded recipe is for C. macrophthalma. The original recipe book, by Mithaecus, is now lost, but the recipe itself survives thanks to being quoted in the Deipnosophistae.

References 

 
Cepolinae
Taxa named by Carl Linnaeus